Quintus Caecilius Metellus may refer to:

 Quintus Caecilius Metellus (consul 206 BC)
 Quintus Caecilius Metellus Balearicus
 Quintus Caecilius Metellus Celer
 Quintus Caecilius Metellus Creticus
 Quintus Caecilius Metellus Creticus Silanus
 Quintus Caecilius Metellus Macedonicus
 Quintus Caecilius Metellus Nepos (consul 98 BC)
 Quintus Caecilius Metellus Nepos (consul 57 BC)
 Quintus Caecilius Metellus Numidicus
 Quintus Caecilius Metellus Pius
 Quintus Caecilius Metellus Pius Scipio

See also
 Caecilius Metellus (disambiguation)